Glissade may mean:
glissade (climbing), a way to descend a snow-covered slope
glissade (dance move), a move in some dances such as the galop
glissade (ballet), a ballet dance move

See also

Glissando